Daisy-Head Mayzie is a children's book written by Dr. Seuss and illustrated in his style. It was published in 1995, as Seuss's first posthumous book. It was republished on July 5, 2016, with Seuss's original text and drawings.

Plot
The book is about a warmhearted schoolgirl named Mayzie McGrew who one day suddenly sprouts a bright white daisy from her head. It causes alarm in her classroom, family, and town, until an agent makes her a celebrity. Mayzie becomes overwhelmed and distraught over the situation and runs away. The Cat in the Hat, who serves as the narrator to this story, helps Mayzie to understand her problem. He persuades her to go back home, and the daisy eventually goes away, popping up back again on occasion. The book has a mini-song titled "Daisy-Head Mayzie" which her classmates chant.

Adaptations
Prior to its actual publication, the book was adapted into an animated special for television by Hanna-Barbera in Los Angeles, California, produced in association with Tony Collingwood Productions in London, England, and Fil-Cartoons in Manila, Philippines, and premiered February 5, 1995, on TNT. Four months later, on June 6, it was released on VHS by Turner Home Entertainment. The special can also be found as a bonus feature on MGM Animation/Visual Arts' Horton Hears a Who! (1970), which was released on a Deluxe Edition DVD by Warner Home Video on March 4, 2008. It was also the final television special in three-strip color process.

In 2011, Daisy-Head Mayzie was made a meetable character at Seuss Landing in Universal's Islands of Adventure theme park, part of the Universal Orlando Resort in Orlando, Florida.

Cast
 Francesca Smith as Mayzie McGrew
 Henry Gibson as The Cat in the Hat
 Tim Curry as Finagle
 George Hearn as Mayor
 Lewis Arquette as Principal Gregory Grumm
 Jonathan Winters as Dr. Eisenbart
 Susan Silo as Miss Sneetcher
 B. J. Ward as Mrs. McGrew
 Paul Eiding as Mr. McGrew
 Robert Ridgely as Finch
 Benjamin Smith as Butch
 John Graas as Einstein

Differences in the 2016 edition
In 2016, after the popularity of What Pet Should I Get?, the book was republished with Seuss' original text and illustrations. As such, there are several differences between the editions.

 The Cat in the Hat does not appear as the narrator. 
 The characters are all designed differently and are given normal hairstyles, as opposed to the wild hairstyles in the 1995 edition.
 Instead of catching all of the bees in his hat, the police officer puts a fishbowl over Mayzie's head to protect her from the bees.
 Mrs. McGrew is a housewife instead of a welder.
 The plot in which the agent gives Mayzie a contract to be rich and famous is completely absent.
 Because of the absence of the Cat in the Hat, the daisy instead assures Mayzie that everyone loves her, and her flight with the Cat on the flying umbrella is not present.

References

External links
 

American picture books
Books by Dr. Seuss
1995 children's books
Books published posthumously
Random House books
Hanna-Barbera television specials
1995 films
Child characters in animation
Child characters in animated films
Child characters in literature
Child characters in musical theatre
The Cat in the Hat
1990s American films